Hahdhu is a 2017 Maldivian romantic film directed by Abdul Faththaah. Produced by Abdul Faththaah and Niuma Mohamed under Red Production, the film stars Mariyam Azza, Ahmed Shiban and Aminath Rishfa in pivotal roles. The film was released on 6 September 2017.

Plot 
Yusra, a young women returns to her home island after completing her studies from Mal'e. She meets a young man named Ali and fell in love with him during the trip. On the other hand, Hamza is a young man who face humiliations from the society due to his mother's extra-marital affairs. On day Yusra save Hamza from committing suicide because he is tried of his mother's action, after which Hazma developed feelings for her.

Yusra goes to a nearby island and there she and Ali ends up having sex. during that night Ali was attacked by some goons and get admitted in the hospital. in the hospital Ali's mother insult Yusra and her mother. Yusra scold Ali's mother and Ali thought Yusra insulted his mother and left her. After Ali's departure Yusra learns that she is pregnant with Ali's child. She tried to tell Ali about this but he refuse talking to her.

Yusra quit her job as a teacher a decided to repent her mistake. She told her mother her pregnancy and her mother abounded her. Yusra and her mother got humiliated as she got pregnant without marrying someone. Her mother died unable to bear the humiliation. Hamza who fell in love with Yusra stood her her side during even after her delivery. on the other hand, Ali married his childhood love Zamha after her husband died in a car accident. Ali live a happy life with her wife and step-daughter until he learn about. he visit Yusra's island only to find Yusra dead.

Repenting for his mistake, Ali decided to take care of his and Yusra's son Samh. He brings Samh to Zamha and ask for her apology, but Zamha refused to and kicked him out of her life. The flim ends with Zamh's father asking her if she could accept Samh as her own son and give him the love of a mother.

Cast 
 Mariyam Azza as Yusra Ali
 Shiban Ahmed as Ali
 Aminath Rishfa as Zamha
 Ahmed Fairooz as Azim
 Ali Azim as Hamza
 Arifa Ibrahim as Ali's mother
 Mohamed Rasheed as Firag; Zamha's father
 Gulisthan Mohamed as Haamida; Zamha's mother
 Mariyam Shakeela as Hamza's mother
 Fauziyya Hassan as Yusra's mother
 Mariyam Haleem as Dhaleyka
 Aishath Rasheedha
 Mohamed Najah as Mohamed
 Aminath Muhusina
 Faiha Ibrahim
 Nuzuhath Shuaib in the item number "Girity Loabin" (Special appearance)

Reception 
Hahdhu received mixed reviews from critics. Aishath Maaha of Avas praised the performance of Azza and Rishfa while she criticised Shiban's acting in his debut film. Though the screenplay by Ahmed was favored, she noticed some "loopholes that restricted character development".

Soundtrack

Accolades

References

External links 
 

2017 films
Maldivian romance films
2017 romance films
Films directed by Abdul Faththaah